Ingrid Charlotte Dreschler (née Metzner; born 27 May 1937) is a Brazilian former tennis player.

Born in Rio de Janeiro, Metzner comes from a family of German descent. She was raised in São Paulo from the age of nine and trained at the local Esporte Clube Pinheiros.

Metzner represented Brazil at the 1955 Pan American Games and won a bronze medal in the singles, as well as a bronze medal in the doubles, partnering Maria Bueno.

In 1956 she went to Europe and participated in both the French Championships and Wimbledon, becoming the first Brazilian woman to compete in either event. At the French Championships she took a set off 12th seed Darlene Hard in a first round loss, then at Wimbledon she made it through to the second round.

References

External links
 

1937 births
Living people
Brazilian female tennis players
Pan American Games medalists in tennis
Pan American Games bronze medalists for Brazil
Tennis players at the 1955 Pan American Games
Brazilian people of German descent
Medalists at the 1955 Pan American Games
Sportspeople from Rio de Janeiro (city)
21st-century Brazilian women
20th-century Brazilian women